Cogia is a genus of Neotropical butterflies in the family Hesperiidae (Eudaminae).

Species
The following species are recognised in the genus Cogia:
Cogia abdul Hayward, 1947
Cogia azila Evans, 1953
Cogia aziris (Hewitson, 1867)
Cogia caicus (Herrich-Schäffer, 1869)
Cogia calchas (Herrich-Schäffer, 1869)
Cogia cerradicola (Mielke, 1967)
Cogia crameri (McHenry, 1960)
Cogia cursinoi (O. Mielke, 1979)
Cogia elaites (Hewitson, 1867)
Cogia eliasi (O. Mielke, 1979)
Cogia galbula (Plötz, 1881)
Cogia goya (Evans, 1952)
Cogia grandis Riley, 1921
Cogia hassan Butler, 1870
Cogia hippalus (Edwards, 1882)
Cogia outis (Skinner, 1894)
Cogia optica (Evans, 1952)
Cogia punctilia Plötz, 1882
Cogia stylites (Herrich-Schäffer, 1869)
Cogia troilus Mabille, 1898
Cogia undulatus (Hewitson, 1867)

Biology 
The larvae feed on  Leguminosae including Acacia Indigofera, Mimosa and on  Moraceae  (Milicia)

References

Natural History Museum Lepidoptera genus database
Cogia at funet

Hesperiidae
Hesperiidae genera
Taxa named by Arthur Gardiner Butler